Mayor Galo de la Torre Airport  was an airport serving Tena, Napo Province, Ecuador. It closed in 2001 and was replaced by Jumandy Airport,  to the east, in 2011.

History 
Mayor Galo de la Torre Airport was constructed along with airstrips at Pano and Shandia to improve connectivity between Napo Province and the rest of the country. Unlike the latter two which began to decline from the 1950s onward, the airport in Tena was highly used for passenger and cargo transport to and from Quito. The airport was also used by the Ecuadorian Army for logistic works.

During the 1960s and 70s, Transportes Aéreos Orientales (TAO) operated flights between Tena and Quito. SAEREO also flew this route at one point.

The airport was closed in 2001, replaced by Jumandy Airport in Ahuano in 2011.

Infrastructure

See also 
 
 
 Jumandy Airport

References 

Google Maps - Tena

Defunct airports in Ecuador
Airports disestablished in 2001
Airports in Napo Province